Țepeș Vodă may refer to several villages in Romania:

 Țepeș Vodă, a village in Movila Miresii Commune, Brăila County
 Țepeș Vodă, a village in Siliștea Commune, Constanța County